Union Local High School is a public high school in Belmont County, Ohio/Morristown, Ohio, United States. It is the only high school in the Union Local School District. Athletic teams compete as the Union Local Jets in the Ohio High School Athletic Association as a member of the Buckeye 8 Athletic League as well as the Ohio Valley Athletic Conference.

Athletics

Wrestling
Union Local is the home of 3-time Ohio State Wrestling Champion Koel Davia. Koel won his titles in the 275 pound division in consecutive years from 2002-04.
Union Local is the alma mater of Travis Clark.
Union Local Has 1 National Championship in 1992 with John Gibeaut.

Marching Band
Under the direction of Thomas Swisher, the Union Local High School Marching band competes in Ohio Music Education Association adjudicated events across the state of Ohio. In 2016, the Union Local High School Marching band qualified for OMEA State Finals for the first time in school history. In 2017, the Marching Band qualified for OMEA State Finals again. The Marching Band qualified for OMEA State Finals for their third time in 2019.

Theatre
The Union Local Drama Club is co-directed by Jim Ellis, Sheri McElroy, and Alex Ross.

Notes and references

External links
 District Website
 Union Local School Report Card

High schools in Belmont County, Ohio
Public high schools in Ohio
1959 establishments in Ohio
Educational institutions established in 1959